Xera is a stick insect genus in the family Pseudophasmatidae.

Species list
 Xera apolinari
 Xera debilis
 Xera magdalenae Conle, Hennemann & Gutierréz, 2011 (Colombia: Magdalena)
 Xera tenaense Conle, Hennemann & Gutierréz, 2011 (Colombia: Cundinamarca)

References

External links
 Xera on globalspecies.org

Phasmatodea genera
Taxa named by Ludwig Redtenbacher